McCusick syndrome is characterized by short-limbed dwarfism and fine, sparse, hypoplastic, and dysmorphic hair.

See also
 Skin lesion

References

Genodermatoses
Syndromes